The Ja'alin, Ja'aliya, Ja'aliyin or Ja'al are an Arab or Arabised Nubian tribe in Sudan. The Ja'alin constitute a large portion of the Sudanese Arabs and are one of the three prominent Sudanese Arab tribes in northern Sudan - the others being the Shaigiya and Danagla. They trace their origin to Ibrahim Ja'al, an Abbasid noble, whose clan originally hailed from the Hejaz in the Arabian Peninsula and married into the local Nubian population. Ja'al was a descendant of al-Abbas, an uncle of Muhammad. The Ja'alin formerly occupied the country on both banks of the Nile from Khartoum to Abu Hamad. According to a source, the tribe allegedly once spoke a now extinct dialect of Nubian as late as the nineteenth century. Many Sudanese politicians have come from the Ja'alin tribal coalition.

History
The Ja'alin trace their lineage to Abbas, uncle of Muhammad. At the Egyptian invasion in 1811 they were the most powerful of Arab tribes in the Nile valley. They submitted at first, but in 1822 rebelled and massacred the Egyptian garrison at Shendi with the Mek Nimr, a Ja'ali King (mek) burning Ismail, Muhammad Ali Pasha's son and his cortege at a banquet. The revolt was mercilessly suppressed, and the Ja'alin were thence forward looked on with suspicion. They were almost the first of the northern tribes to join the Mahdi in 1884, and it was their position to the north of Khartoum which made communication with General Gordon so difficult. The Ja'alin then became a semi-nomad agricultural people.

The Anglo-Egyptian re-conquest of the Sudan began in 1896.  In July 1897 Ja'alin tribal leaders refused to allow the Mahdist forces to occupy the Ja’alin town of Metemmeh, a strategic point on the Nile, 180 kilometres downstream of Omdurman. They feared the occupation would be oppressive, threatening both lives and property. After the Khalifa refused an offer from their leaders for the Ja’alin themselves to protect this stretch of the Nile from advancing Anglo-Egyptian forces, the Ja'alin leaders requested protection from General Kitchener, commander of the Anglo-Egyptian army. In response, the Mahdist forces attacked Metemmeh, killing several thousand Ja’alin, including women and children, with the killings continuing in the following year.  As a consequence, Ja’alin tribesmen supported the Anglo-Egyptian forces on their advance on Omdurman in 1898, including supplying an irregular force of 2,500 cavalry, which helped clear the east bank of the Nile of Mahdist fighters in the days before the Battle of Omdurman.

Location
This group of over four million people live in cities and large towns along the banks of the Nile River, especially in the ancient town of Shendi which has historically served as their tribal capital. The area is very hot and dry, with an average yearly rainfall of about three inches.

Lifestyle
Some Ja'alin still farm and raise livestock along the banks of the Nile River, but in the 21st century, they more commonly make up a large part of the Sudanese urban population, forming a large part of the merchant class. Although many have moved to cities, such as the Sudanese capital of Khartoum, they still maintain their tribal identity and solidarity. Famous for maintaining ties with their origins, they keep in contact with their original home and return for frequent visits, especially for marriages, funerals and Muslim festivals.

Sub-groups 
Historically, a small group called the Meyrifab was sometimes classed with the Ja'alin, but the Ja'alin themselves rejected this inclusion.

Notes

Literature
 
 
 
 
  (see pages 16 and 17)

See also 
 Zubayrids

 
Tribes of Sudan
Arabs in Sudan
Hashemite people
Hashemite people in Sudan
Sudanese people of Nubian descent